Sylvester J. Ryan (September 10, 1896 – April 10, 1981) was a United States district judge of the United States District Court for the Southern District of New York from 1947 to 1981 and its Chief Judge from 1959 to 1966.

Education and career

Born in New York City, New York, Ryan attended the City College of New York and then received a Bachelor of Laws from Fordham University School of Law in 1917. He was in private practice in New York City from 1918 to 1924. He was a chief assistant and acting District Attorney of Bronx County, New York from 1924 to 1947.

Federal judicial service

Ryan received a recess appointment from President Harry S. Truman on November 1, 1947, to a seat on the United States District Court for the Southern District of New York vacated by Judge Francis Gordon Caffey. He was nominated to the same seat by President Truman on November 24, 1947. He was confirmed by the United States Senate on December 18, 1947, and received his commission on December 20, 1947. He served as Chief Judge from 1959 to 1966 and as a member of the Judicial Conference of the United States from 1959 to 1968. He assumed senior status on January 3, 1973. Ryan served in that capacity until his death on April 10, 1981, in New York City.

References

Sources
 

1896 births
1981 deaths
Lawyers from New York City
City College of New York alumni
Fordham University School of Law alumni
Judges of the United States District Court for the Southern District of New York
United States district court judges appointed by Harry S. Truman
20th-century American judges